Challavanipeta is a village in  Srikakulam district in Andhra Pradesh, India.

This village is located near National Highway 326A and Andhrapradesh State Highway 106.

References

Villages in Srikakulam district